The EMD SDP35 is a model of 6-axle diesel-electric locomotive built by General Motors Electro-Motive Division between July 1964 and September 1965. Power was provided by an EMD 567D3A 16-cylinder engine which generated . Essentially this locomotive was an EMD SD35 equipped with a steam generator, located in the extended long hood end, for passenger use. 35 examples of this locomotive model were built for American railroads.

History
With its older E-units reaching the end of their serviceable lives, Seaboard Air Line asked EMD for a passenger version of the SD35 that could double as a freight unit, especially if passenger trains continued to be discontinued.  EMD came up with the SDP35, and SAL placed an order, trading in E4 and E6 units.  The first of SAL's new SDP35s was delivered in summer 1964. Eventually the SDP35 wound up going to four railroads: SAL (20, numbered 1100–1119), Atlantic Coast Line (1, numbered 550), Louisville and Nashville (4, numbered 1700–1703) and Union Pacific (10, numbered 1400–1409).

The SD35 and SDP35 were so similar that EMD published a single operator's manual to cover both.

Although SAL successfully used the SDP35 in high-speed passenger service as well as on expedited freight and piggyback trains, Union Pacific found it unsuitable and relegated its entire fleet to freight service while its famous yellow E-units continued to handle passengers. With the July 1, 1967 Seaboard Coast Line merger, SAL units received passenger numbers 601-620 and also served SCL in both high-speed freight service and on passenger trains. With the arrival of Amtrak, SCL renumbered them into the freight series and numbers 1951–1970. Later in their SCL years, they were renumbered again and assigned into the heavy yard duty and assigned 4500-series numbers. ACL's lone unit was renumbered 1099 when the line acquired former MKT E8s. At the SCL merger, it was assigned number 600 and then later received SCL number 1950.

Louisville & Nashville's four SDP35s (1700–1703), ordered in spring 1964 to replace aging E and F units in passenger service, were completed and delivered without steam generation equipment installed, after approval of several passenger train cancellations from government regulatory agencies during the locomotives' assembly, leaving L&N with a surplus of passenger locomotives. After delivery L&N assigned the SDP35s to general freight service, installing radio control locomotive equipment in the steam generator compartment and using the engines in locotrol service until 1969.
In 1966, when the EMD 645 prime mover superseded the EMD 567, the SDP35 was replaced in EMD's catalog by the EMD SDP40.

Original owners

Preservation
Seaboard Air Line Railroad 1114 is displayed by the depot in Hamlet, North Carolina. It is owned by the National Railroad Museum and Hall of Fame.

References

Louisville & Nashville Diesel Locomotives.  Charles B. Castner, Ronald Flanery, Lee Gorden
,   1997 TLC Publishing.

 
 
 Thompson, J. David. EMD SD35 and related models Original Owners. Retrieved on August 27, 2006
 National Railroad Museum and Hall of Fame.  Retrieved on May 27, 2009.
 

SD35P
C-C locomotives
Passenger locomotives
Railway locomotives introduced in 1964
Standard gauge locomotives of the United States